Bundesstraße 62 or B62 is a German federal road. It connects Roth (Altenkirchen) with Barchfeld.

See also 
 List of federal highways in Germany

062
Roads in North Rhine-Westphalia
Roads in Thuringia
Roads in Hesse
Roads in Rhineland-Palatinate